Yawa (Yava) is the Papuan language of central Yapen Island in Geelvink (Cenderawasih) Bay, Indonesia. Alternative names are Iau (not the same as Iau language), Mantembu, Mora, Turu, and Yapanani.

Phonology

Vowels

Consonants

References

Yawa languages
Languages of western New Guinea
Papua (province) culture